Tazehabad-e Qaragol (also Romanized as Tāzehābād-e Qarāgol; also known as Khairabad, Qarā Gol, Qarā Gūl, Qarāvol, Qarawal, Qara Wul, and Tāzehābād) is a village in Hoseynabad-e Jonubi Rural District, in the Central District of Sanandaj County, Kurdistan Province, Iran. At the 2006 census, its population was 148, in 34 families. The village is populated by Kurds.

References 

Towns and villages in Sanandaj County
Kurdish settlements in Kurdistan Province